A. graveolens may refer to:
 Anathallis graveolens, an orchid species
 Anethum graveolens, the dill, a cultivated plant species
 Apium graveolens, the celery, a cultivated plant species
 Astronium graveolens, a flowering tree species native to Central America and South America

See also